Axcel is a leading Nordic private equity firm with offices in Stockholm and Copenhagen. Since its foundation in 1994, Axcel has made 68 platform investments and today the firm owns 19 companies across all four Nordic countries.

Axcel invests in high-quality companies with a strong market position, compelling product and/or service offering and robust underlying growth potential. Axel has a focused investment strategy which targets four industry verticals: business services/industrials, healthcare, IT & technology and consumer goods.

Since its inception, Axcel has raised six funds with total committed capital of over EUR 2.6bn. In August 2021, Axcel closed its sixth fund (Axcel VI) at EUR 807m.

Organisation
 Christian Schmidt-Jacobsen, managing partner
 Christian Bamberger Bro, partner 
 Thomas Blomqvist, partner
 Lars Cordt, partner 
 Asbjørn Hyldgaard, partner
 Björn Larsson, partner
 Christoffer Müller, partner

Active Investments
Axcel currently owns the following companies:

Exits
Axcel has exited the following companies:

References

External links
 Official website

Private equity firms of Denmark
Financial services companies based in Copenhagen
Danish companies established in 1994
Financial services companies established in 1994
Companies based in Copenhagen Municipality